High Performance FC is a Puerto Rican soccer team that plays in San Juan.  They play in the Liga Nacional.

Liga Nacional
Lost their first game 5-2 to Bayamon FC.

Current squad

References

Puerto Rico Soccer League 2nd Division
Football clubs in Puerto Rico
Liga Nacional de Fútbol de Puerto Rico teams